Brazilian Nationals Jiu-Jitsu No-Gi Championship is a no-gi Brazilian Jiu-Jitsu (BJJ) tournament hosted annually by the CBJJ since 2009 in Rio de Janeiro, Brazil.

Men's champions

Women's champions

See also 
 IBJJF
 World Jiu-Jitsu Championship
 World No-Gi Championship
 Pan Jiu-Jitsu Championship
 Pan Jiu-Jitsu No-Gi Championship
 European Open Championship
 European Open Nogi Championship
 Brazilian National Jiu-Jitsu Championship
 Asian Open Championship

References

External links 

Brazilian jiu-jitsu competitions
No-Gi Brazilian jiu-jitsu competitions